is a children's comedy manga series written and illustrated by . The series was published by Poplar Publishing Co. Ltd. in Japan and licensed by Viz Media in North America.

Further reading

References

External links
 
 Leave it to PET! at Viz Media

2004 manga
Children's manga
Comedy anime and manga
Shōnen manga
Viz Media manga